Borgosesia railway station is the train station serving the comune of Borgosesia, in the Piedmont region, northwestern Italy. It is the junction of the Novara–Varallo.

The station is currently managed by Rete Ferroviaria Italiana (RFI).  However, the passenger building is managed by comune. The station is served only by historic trains, in the service of tourism, in planned dates. The service ordinary passengers  It has been suspended from 15 September 2014, by decision of the Piedmont Region. Train services are operated by Fondazione FS and Trenitalia.  Each of these companies is a subsidiary of Ferrovie dello Stato (FS), Italy's state-owned rail company.

History
The station was opened on 6 November 1885, upon the inauguration the third part of the Novara–Varallo railway, from Grignasco to Borgosesia.

Features
Three tracks, two of which are equipped with platforms.

Train services
The station is served by the following services:

Historic train (Treno storico) Novara - Varallo Sesia

See also

 History of rail transport in Italy
 List of railway stations in Piedmont
 Rail transport in Italy
 Railway stations in Italy

References

External links

Borgosesia
Railway stations in Piedmont
Railway stations opened in 1885